Alice Minna Irmeli Herbst (born April 13, 1993) is a Swedish former fashion model, best known for winning the fifth cycle of Sweden's Next Top Model in 2012. She is the cousin of Victoria's Secret model Elsa Hosk.

Herbst gave up modeling in August 2012 after discovering the poor work ethics of the industry.

Artwork 
Herbst started studying art at the age of 21 and is now a full time artist. Her work is primarily figurative and has been described by The Art Gorgeous magazine as "depicting beautiful women being staged in a vintaged manner – imagine a kind of Hitchcock movie meets Lucian Freud." After graduating from the Gerlesborg School of Fine Art she has developed her abstract figurative style with influences from both impressionism and the postmodern era. She describes her paintings as "Parts of stories that could be self-experienced or inspired by daily observations."

Personal life

According to Aftonbladet, Herbst had body dysmorphic disorder as a teenager.

References

External links

Swedish female models
1993 births
Living people
Next Top Model winners
21st-century Swedish painters